Metrodorus is the name of numerous historical figures, including:
 Metrodorus of Lampsacus (the elder) (5th century BC), philosopher from the school of Anaxagoras
 Metrodorus of Cos (5th century BC), Pythagorean writer
 Metrodorus of Chios (4th century BC), philosopher from the school of Democritus
 Metrodorus of Lampsacus (the younger) (331–278 BC), Epicurean philosopher
 Metrodorus of Athens (mid 2nd century BC), philosopher and painter
 Metrodorus of Stratonicea (late 2nd century BC), philosopher, originally Epicurean, later a follower of Carneades
 Metrodorus of Scepsis (c. 145 BC – 70 BC), writer, orator and politician
 Metrodorus (grammarian) (c. 6th century AD), grammarian and mathematician who collected the mathematical epigrams in the Greek Anthology
 Metrodorus (4th century BC), physician who married Aristotle's daughter Pythias
 Metrodorus (late 3rd, early 2nd century BC), general in the employ of Philip V of Macedon during the Cretan War
 Metrodorus (late 1st, early 2nd century AD), pupil of the physician Sabinus